Telšių apskritis was one of the counties of the Russian Empire. The seat was in Telšiai.

Administration
In 1819, the Palangos valsčius came to Grobin County of Courland Governorate.

Outer administration
It was established in 1795 under Vilna Governorate. In 1843, it was transferred to a newly established Kovno Governorate.

Inner administration
In 1791, it the following pavietai: Telšių pavietas, Viešvėnų pavietas, Patumšių pavietas, Platelių pavietas, Gandingos pavietas, Medingėnų pavietas, Žarėnų pavietas, Tverų pavietas, Šauduvos pavietas, Palangos pavietas.

In 1913, it had the following pavietai: 
 Paukštakiai
 Varniai
 Nevarėnai
 Gintališkė
 Gargždai
 Darbėnai
 Židikai
 Žarėnai
 Ylakiai
 Kartena
 Kretinga
 Mosėdis
 Alsėdžiai
 Plungė
 Salantai
 Seda
 Tirkšliai
 Skuodas

Demographics
At the time of the Russian Empire Census of 1897, Telshevsky Uyezd had a population of 183,351. Of these, 81.2% spoke Lithuanian, 12.4% Yiddish, 2.3% Latvian, 1.5% Polish, 1.3% Russian, 0.9% German, 0.3% Ukrainian and 0.1% Belarusian as their native language.

References

 
Uezds of Vilna Governorate
Uezds of Kovno Governorate
Kovno Governorate